Gretton was a rural district in Northamptonshire, England from 1894 to 1935.  It was formed from the Northamptonshire part of the Uppingham rural sanitary district (the Rutland parts of which formed Uppingham Rural District and the Leicestershire parts of which formed Hallaton Rural District).

It consisted of the following parishes
Fineshade
Gretton
Harringworth
Laxton
Rockingham
Wakerley

It was abolished under a County Review Order and split, with Gretton and Rockingham going to Kettering Rural District and the other four parishes going to the new Oundle and Thrapston Rural District.

References
http://www.visionofbritain.org.uk/relationships.jsp?u_id=10027196

History of Northamptonshire
Local government in Northamptonshire
Districts of England created by the Local Government Act 1894
Rural districts of England